Manchester Township is one of the fifteen townships of Adams County, Ohio, United States.  The 2010 census found 2,052 people in the township, most of whom lived in the village of Manchester.

Geography
Located in the southwestern part of the county along the Ohio River, it borders the following townships:
Monroe Township - east
Sprigg Township - west
Lewis County, Kentucky lies across the Ohio River to the south.

Most of the village of Manchester is located in southern Manchester Township along the Ohio River.

Name and history
Statewide, the only other Manchester Township is located in Morgan County.

Government
The township is governed by a three-member board of trustees, who are elected in November of odd-numbered years to a four-year term beginning on the following January 1. Two are elected in the year after the presidential election and one is elected in the year before it. There is also an elected township fiscal officer, who serves a four-year term beginning on April 1 of the year after the election, which is held in November of the year before the presidential election. Vacancies in the fiscal officership or on the board of trustees are filled by the remaining trustees.

References

External links
County website

Townships in Adams County, Ohio
Townships in Ohio